Jefferson Bellaguarda (born 12 September 1976) is a Swiss male beach volleyball player. He competed for Switzerland at the 2012 Summer Olympics, teaming with Patrick Heuscher.  Together they reached the last 16.

References

1976 births
Living people
Swiss beach volleyball players
Men's beach volleyball players
Beach volleyball players at the 2012 Summer Olympics
Olympic beach volleyball players of Switzerland
Place of birth missing (living people)